Numan Acar (born 7 October 1974) is a Turkish-German actor and film producer.

Life and career
Acar was born in 1974 in Kozoglu, a small village in the Kelkit district of Turkey; he lived in the nearby city of Erzincan until 1982, when his family emigrated to Germany. Acar earned a degree in civil engineering, then switched his focus to acting. He started performing in both Turkish and German films, then started Acar Entertainment in 2007, producing German-Turkish movies.

After numerous roles in Turkish, German and South Korean film and television productions, Acar played his first role in an American production in 2014, as Haissam Haqqani in season four of Homeland. He reprised the role in 2020 for Homeland eighth and final season.

He portrayed Dmitri Smerdyakov in the 2019 Marvel film, Spider-Man: Far From Home.

Acar, who lives in Berlin, speaks several languages fluently including German, Turkish, Spanish and English and has knowledge of Kurdish, Azerbaijani and Arabic.

Filmography

Film

Television

References

External links
 
 

1974 births
Living people
20th-century Turkish male actors
21st-century Turkish male actors
People from Kelkit
Turkish emigrants to Germany
Turkish film producers
Turkish male film actors
Turkish male television actors